Khalkhal and Kowsar (electoral district) is the 4th electoral district in the Ardabil Province Of Iran. It has a population of 118,530 and elects 1 member of parliament.

1980
MP in 1980 from the electorate of Khalkhal. (1st)
 Ghafour Sadegh-Khalkhali

1984
MP in 1984 from the electorate of Khalkhal. (2nd)
 Motahhar Kazemi

1988
MPs in 1988 from the electorate of Khalkhal. (3rd)
 Motahhar Kazemi

1992
MP in 1992 from the electorate of Khalkhal. (4th)
 Motahhar Kazemi

1996
MP in 1996 from the electorate of Khalkhal. (5th)
 Motahhar Kazemi

2000
MP in 2000 from the electorate of Khalkhal and Kowsar. (6th)
 Mehrangiz Morovvati

2004
MPs in 2004 from the electorate of Khalkhal and Kowsar. (7th)
 Mehrangiz Morovvati

2008
MP in 2008 from the electorate of Khalkhal and Kowsar. (8th)
 Bashir Khaleghi

2012
MP in 2012 from the electorate of Khalkhal and Kowsar. (9th)
 Jalil Jafari

2016

Notes

References

Electoral districts of Ardabil Province
Khalkhal County
Kowsar County
Deputies of Khalkhal and Kowsar